Sonny Tufail Perkins (born 10 February 2004) is an English professional footballer who plays as a forward for Premier League club Leeds United.

Club career

West Ham United
In 2019, Perkins joined West Ham United from Leyton Orient at under-15 level. On 25 November 2021, Perkins was involved in a West Ham senior matchday squad for the first time, being named on the bench for a UEFA Europa League group game against Rapid Wien, coming on as a 78th minute substitute. In July 2022, Perkins rejected West Ham’s offer of a professional contract and left the club with immediate effect. He made three appearances for the club, one in the Premier League and two in the Europa League.

Leeds United
On 19 July 2022, he joined Leeds United signing a three-year contract. He made his debut for Leeds on 9 November 2022 in the starting line-up for the 1–0 EFL Cup third round defeat to Wolverhampton Wanderers. Perkins scored his first professional goal against Cardiff City at the Cardiff City Stadium in the FA Cup 3rd round tie on 8 January 2023 when he came on as a second-half substitute, scoring the equaliser in stoppage time to earn a 2–2 draw for Leeds, forcing a replay.

International career
In July 2018, whilst still at Leyton Orient, Perkins was called up to England's under-15 side. In February 2020, Perkins scored a hat-trick for England U16 against the United States. On 18 October 2021, a month after his debut for the side, Perkins scored his first goal for England U18's in a 3–0 win against Russia.

On 21 September 2022, Perkins made his England U19 debut and scored during a 2-0 2023 U19 EURO qualifying win over Montenegro in Denmark.

Style of play
Perkins' captain at West Ham, Mark Noble, praised Perkins' hold-up play, as well as his versatility, saying "he started in the No10 role and he’s moved up to the centre-forward role for the U23s, and scored a lot of goals".

Personal life
Perkins' father, Declan, is a former Irish youth international footballer. His aunt is the actress Louise Lombard.

Career statistics

Honours

Individual
West Ham United Dylan Tombides Award: 2021–22

Notes

References

2004 births
Living people
Footballers from the London Borough of Waltham Forest
Association football midfielders
English footballers
English people of Irish descent
West Ham United F.C. players
England youth international footballers
Premier League players
Leeds United F.C. players